The Fiat Argo (Type 358, codeproject X6H) is a subcompact car (B-segment) by the Italian manufacturer Fiat, developed for the market in South America. It was presented in Brazil in May 2017, being sold as of June. It is a five-door hatchback that replaced the Fiat Punto and the Fiat Palio. The Argo was presented a year later than planned, and was developed to strengthen Fiat's offering in the subcompact (B) segment, traditionally an important one for Fiat.

A sedan version was launched in 2018, with the name Fiat Cronos.

Powertrain

The 3-cylinder 1.0L version of the Firefly engine is exclusive to the Brazilian local market, where such displacement range is benefitted from a lower taxation, while the available 1.3L is standard elsewhere. At the launch, the 1.3 engine was available with the option for an automated-manual transmission named GSR, which was phased out in 2019, while the 1.8L E.torQ has retained the availability of an automatic transmission. For the Trekking trim released in 2019, the 1.3 is the base engine and the 1.8 is offered only with the automatic transmission. All engines are flexfuel for Brazil, and gasoline-only elsewhere.

Facelift 
In late July 2022, a facelift was presented with redesigned bumper and front grille, steering wheel, wheels and interior trim.

Safety 
The Argo has front ventilated disc brakes.

Sales

Notes

References

External links

 

Argo
Subcompact cars
Hatchbacks
Cars introduced in 2017
2020s cars
Cars of Brazil